In the town of Lorain, Ohio, located just west of Cleveland, the 1,720-seat Lorain Palace Theatre first opened in 1928. It was the first motion picture theater in Ohio to show a talking motion picture.  The opening night film, and first talky played in Ohio was a pre-release of Paramount’s "Something Always Happens" starring Neil Hamilton and Esther Ralston. Today it serves as a community Civic Center, movie theatre, meeting place and entertainment facility. The crystal chandelier, Wurlitzer pipe organ (one of only four remaining in theaters across Ohio), and two spacious loges are just some of the features which made this building worthy of being preserved.

History

The theatre was built as part of an initiative to rebuild downtown Lorain, following a devastating tornado destroyed most of the 44,000 inhabitant town's urban center. It still has its original Wurlitzer theatre organ and was popular well into the 1960s. When it was completed, it was the largest one floor motion picture theatre in Ohio. Popularity of the theatre diminished following the construction of the nearby mall in the mid-1960s. Several other theatres and shops in the area closed their doors at this time.

Renovation
Restoration of the theatre began in 1977 and so far the non-profit organization operating the location has raised an excess of $6 million towards the cost of its restoration and renovation. Twenty-five thousand dollars was tendered as a down payment toward the purchase of the $100,000 building. A capital funds campaign was launched and in May 1977 the Palace Theater building was purchased and a grand opening was held. The Palace had been using the same carbon arc projectors since 1935. The light on the screen was created when 80 amps of electricity jumped between two large pencil-sized carbon rods. Recently the theatre moved those projectors into the lobby and installed a new theatre system including a new platter projector, a digital projector, and a 16-speaker theatre surround sound system.

In 2008 a plan was made to connect the Lorain Palace Theatre with the adjacent Eagles Building via a glass arcade. The project would partly be funded by a $200,000 grant from the city of Lorain, most of which would be required to purchase the Eagles Building while the rest would go to construction costs to the facade and marquee of the theatre. However, an additional $7.5 million would be needed to complete the project, which includes renovating the interior and exterior of the  Eagles building, as well as a section of the theater and the construction of the arcade.

Lorain Palace today

The Palace Theatre in Lorain continues to have funding issues but has thus far managed to hit fund-raising goals to keep its doors open. In October 2008, the theatre held a masquerade ball which helped bring in an additional $6,000. The theatre has also made several budget cuts and for now is managing to keep itself going with the aid of donations and other fund-raising efforts.

References

See also

 Movie palaces list

Buildings and structures in Lorain, Ohio
National Register of Historic Places in Lorain County, Ohio
Theatres in Ohio
Theatres on the National Register of Historic Places in Ohio
Theatres completed in 1928
1928 establishments in Ohio